Stražišče is a small settlement in the hills north of Begunje in the Municipality of Cerknica in the Inner Carniola region of Slovenia.

Geography

There is a spring known as Sladka voda (literally, 'sweet water, fresh water') in the southeast part of the settlement along the road to Selšček.

References

External links

Stražišče on Geopedia

Populated places in the Municipality of Cerknica